Mark Grigorian (April 29, 1900 – January 10, 1978) was a Soviet Armenian neoclassical architect.

Life
Born in Nakhichevan-on-Don, southern Russia, Grigorian moved to Soviet Armenia in 1924. He graduated from the Yerevan State University in 1928 and was appointed as chief architect of Yerevan in 1939, succeeding Nikolay Buniatyan.

Works
Grigorian designed (or co-designed) several major landmarks of Yerevan, including the buildings where the three branches of the government are housed—all on Baghramyan Avenue, and three of the five buildings around Republic Square, along with Eduard Sarapian.

Below are listed his most notable works, all in Yerevan:

References

1900 births
1978 deaths
Armenian architects
People from Rostov-on-Don
Armenian people from the Russian Empire
Soviet architects
20th-century Armenian architects